The Cavern Mecca was a Beatles museum in Liverpool. Founded in 1981 and named for the Cavern Club, it was instrumental in the birth of Beatles fan-based tourism in Liverpool. It was located on the corner of Rainford Square and Mathew Street.

The museum was founded and run by Liz and Jim Hughes, who "single-handedly jump-started" what became the annual Beatles Convention in Liverpool, now part of the Beatles Week festival. When the museum and fan club were founded, the Beatles had been out of fashion and little acknowledged in Liverpool. The Cavern Club itself, where the Beatles had frequently played in their early years after returning from Hamburg, was closed in 1973 and later filled in as part of construction of the Merseyrail underground rail loop. In the same year as the opening of the Cavern Mecca, plans were announced to excavate and reopen the Cavern Club. The Cavern Club, complete with excavation of the original club, remained open from 1984 to 1989 before again closing, only to re-open again in 1991 as both a club and museum. The Cavern Mecca closed in December 1984 when founder Liz Hughes fell ill. Co-founder Jim Hughes died in 2018. In 2003, a signed copy of the Beatles album Sgt. Pepper's Lonely Hearts Club Band, together with an official souvenir programme from the fourth annual Beatles Convention of Cavern Mecca, sold for $290,000 at auction, breaking the record at the time for the price of a signed Beatles album cover.

See also
The Beatles Story
Liverpool Beatles Museum
List of music museums

References

Bibliography

External links

 
  – created by Alan Curran in 1984 after the original statue in 1981. Original was a fruit of the John Lennon Statue Appeal Fund organized by Jim Hughes of Cavern Mecca.

Music in Liverpool
Music museums in Liverpool
Museums established in 1981
Cultural depictions of the Beatles
Defunct museums in England